The 2018 TCR Scandinavia Touring Car Championship was the eighth Scandinavian Touring Car Championship season. This season was the second season since the introduction of the TCR regulations and the last under the promotion of STCC AB, which declared bankruptcy in early February 2019. The season started at Ring Knutstorp on 4 May and ended at Mantorp Park on 22  September, after six rounds.

Robert Dahlgren is the defending drivers' champion, while Volkswagen Dealer Team Sweden are the defending teams' champions.

Teams and drivers

Calendar 
On 16 November 2017, the calendar was announced which was reduced from seven events to six. The championship will host five rounds in Sweden and the series would make a return to Norway for the first time since 2008 when it was called Swedish Touring Car Championship with the event would be held at the Rudskogen circuit. The Solvalla Circuit in Stockholm and Alastaro Circuit in Finland were dropped.

On 19 December 2017, it was announced that the series would revert to a two-race format after using a three-race format in the previous season. Reversed grids for Race 2 were also reintroduced after being absent from the previous season.

Race calendar and results

Championship standings

Drivers' Championship

Junior Class

Teams' Championship

References

External links 
 

Scandinavian Touring Car Championship
2018 in Swedish motorsport